Marta Figueras-Dotti (born 12 November 1957) is a retired Spanish professional golfer.

Early life
Figueras-Dotti was born in Madrid and her father was the president of the Spanish Golf Association. She started playing golf at 8 years of age.

Amateur career
Figueras-Dotti represented Spain seven straight years at the European Lady Junior's Team Championship, for players up to the age of 21, 1973–1979, being on the winning team in 1975 and 1977 and also winning individually in 1977.

She won several amateur tournaments in Europe, including the Spanish Closed Amateur and the French and Italian Open Amateur Championships in the same year, 1979. At the 1979 European Ladies' Team Championship, where she was part of the Spanish team, at Hermitage Golf Club, outside Dublin, Ireland, she won the individual stroke-play part of the competition, three strokes ahead of the nearest competitor.

She played college golf at the University of Southern California, where she was an All-American in 1982, graduating the same year.

In July 1980, she entered the Women's British Open at Wentworth Club, England, as an amateur, lead after the first round and finished tied second one stroke behind Debbie Massay.

She remained an amateur through the main part of the 1982 season. At the British Ladies Amateur in June, she was tied winner of the 36-hole stroke-play qualification, but was sent out from the tournament in the following match-play. In late July, she entered the 1982 Women's British Open at Royal Birkdale Golf Club, Southport, England, still an amateur. Figueras-Dotti was one shot from the lead after three rounds, but took command of the tournament on the 8th hole of the final round. Despite a bogey 6 on the last hole, she won by one shot, scoring level par over 72 holes. She remains the last amateur to have won the Women's British Open, the tournament that has been recognized as an LPGA major since 2001.

She ended her amateur career by finishing individual runner-up to Juli Inkster at the 1982 Espirito Santo Trophy in Lausanne, Switzerland.

Professional career

Figueras-Dotti became the first Spanish female tournament golf professional. She failed in her first attempt to qualify for the LPGA Tour at the Qualifying School in Sarasota, Florida, in January 1983. Instead she started her professional career in Europe, on the Women Professional Golfers’ European Tour, later named the Ladies European Tour, and quickly won two tournaments in June 1983.

In 1984, her first year on the LPGA Tour, she tied 2nd at the Safeco Classic, at Meridian Valley Country Club in Kent, Washington, and was named the 1984 Rookie of the Year by Golf Digest.

She played on the LPGA Tour from 1984 to 2000. Her career earnings totaled $1,247,905. She achieved five holes-in-one in her LPGA career, and won one tournament, the 1994 Cup Noodles Hawaiian Ladies Open. She also won the unofficial JCPenney Classic with Brad Bryant in 1994.

Figueras-Dotti never got the opportunity to play in the Solheim Cup. Nevertheless, she captained the European team at the 2002 Junior Solheim Cup, acted as a Solheim Cup team helper three times, including in 2013 when Europe secured their first victory on U.S. soil, and was appointed vice-captain for the 2017 Solheim Cup in Iowa, by European team captain Annika Sörenstam.

Private life
In 1990, she played a limited schedule after undergoing surgery for a thyroid tumor. In 1997, she played in just seven events on the LPGA Tour, due to the birth of her first child, son Nicholas Alejandro, born on June 24.

She is the Chairperson of the board of the Ladies European Tour. She runs her own golf academy in her home town Madrid, Spain. Until 2015, she was coaching the Spanish national amateur team and is, since 2016, Director of coaching at the Golf Federation of Morocco.

Amateur wins
1979 Spanish Junior Championship, Spanish Closed Amateur Championship, French Open Amateur Championship, Italian Open Amateur Championship
1982 Italian Open Amateur Championship

Professional wins (5)

LPGA Tour wins (1)

LPGA Tour playoff record (0–1)

Ladies European Tour wins (3)

Note: The Women's British Open was not co-sanctioned by the LPGA until 1994, and did not become an LPGA major until 2001.

Other wins (1)
1994 JCPenney Classic (with Brad Bryant)

Team appearances
Amateur
European Lady Junior's Team Championship (representing Spain): 1973,  1974, 1975 (winners), 1976, 1977 (winners), 1978
European Ladies' Team Championship (representing Spain): 1975, 1977, 1979, 1981
Vagliano Trophy (representing the Continent of Europe): 1981 (winners) 
Espirito Santo Trophy (representing Spain): 1978, 1980, 1982 
Sources:

References

External links

Spanish female golfers
USC Trojans women's golfers
LPGA Tour golfers
1957 births
Living people
20th-century Spanish women
21st-century Spanish women